H.I.T, also known as Homicide Investigation Team, is a 2007 South Korean television series starring Go Hyun-jung, Ha Jung-woo, Kim Jung-min, and Yoon Ji-min. It aired on MBC from March 19 to May 22, 2007 on Mondays and Tuesdays at 21:55 for 20 episodes. A police procedural crime drama that integrated crime scene analysis with action, suspense, and romance, H.I.T represented a departure from the usual Korean drama subjects of love and relationships.

Plot
Tough, sharp-shooting, and just a bit unkempt, Cha Soo-kyung (Go Hyun-jung) is the leader of Investigation Team 1 at the Seoul Metropolitan Police Agency. She is haunted by her failure, years ago, to catch a serial killer who wound up murdering her fiancé and escaping. When a new serial killer whose crimes resemble the old killer's surfaces in Seoul, Cha is appointed as the first female detective to head  H.I.T, the Homicide Investigation Team, charged with capturing the murderer. Soo-kyung's work is her life, and she is most comfortable when she is with her team. Because of her determination and work ethic, she immediately clashes with newly appointed D.A. Kim Jae-yoon (Ha Jung-woo) from the Prosecutor's Office who was assigned to work for H.I.T. Jae-yoon is a laid-back playboy whose greatest priority is to enjoy life. Despite their differences and personal conflicts, the two make a surprisingly formidable crime-fighting duo, and slowly realize that they have a lot to learn from each other. Soo-kyung must overcome her past and her grief for her dead boyfriend, and come to terms with her feelings for Jae-yoon.

Cast

Main characters
Go Hyun-jung as Cha Soo-kyung
Cha Soo-kyung is a lieutenant of Investigation Team 1 at the Seoul Metropolitan Police Agency, and the first female chief of homicide. She is single. Too busy to go home, she spends five days a week at the women's dorm in the Police Agency. Her hair is always messy and she walks around the office in sweats that has "Seoul Police Agency" written on it in huge print. Due to her athlete's foot, she wears toe socks that even the guys refuse to be seen in. Her only hobby is playing ball with her team. She has become tougher than anybody else since she has worked and lived among rugged detectives and criminals, but no one has been to her home. D.A. Kim Jae-yoon is the first one to set foot into her house. The place is simple and neat, and surprisingly, there is a teddy bear on her bed. She did indeed have a feminine side. But the biggest surprise comes from her shoe closet. It is filled with an incredible number of high heels.

She leads a life that confuses even herself on whether she's a man or a woman, but her shoes satisfy her feminine desire. Jae-yoon insists that her shoeholic tendency represents her yearning of her lost femininity and the reality that blocks her from exposing her feminine side. "Dump the toe socks and be a woman," he pleads but she casually blows it off. She shuts him up by solving a case with her expansive knowledge of shoes. She has the ability to recreate a crime scene with the shoe prints at the scene and predicts the criminal's occupation or traits by analyzing the shape and texture of the shoe.

She's a great shooter and is greatly attached to her guns. She has never had to shoot anyone yet but she's always ready for the inevitable circumstance. She believes that the gun puts her on an equal standing with men. She thinks that a woman with a gun versus a man with a gun is more equal than a woman versus a man. That's why she prefers a 38mm revolver to a 22mm.

Soo-kyung believes that: 
"A cop without a sense of justice is nothing but a gangster." 
"Victims are not tools of investigation, they are the purpose."
"Dream teams don't exist. They are created."
"Justice must take place when it can or it may never will."
"Han Sang-min is the only man in my life. The rest fall into three categories; colleagues, criminals or victims."

Ha Jung-woo as Kim Jae-yoon
Kang Soo-han as young Kim Jae-yoon
Kim Jae-yoon is a rookie district attorney at the Prosecutor's Office. He is single and an individualist who believes life is about having fun. The youngest son from a wealthy family, Jae-yoon is so smart that he has never failed a single test in his life. Overly optimistic to the point of being immature, he loves women, gambling, and traveling around the world. He has an extensive knowledge in music and art and whatever else he's interested in. Because he was born with a silver spoon in his mouth, there is nothing that he wants or expects in life.

He thinks the road to happiness is to have less and do less. He went to graduate school simply because he didn't want to get a job. After fulfilling his military duty as a KATUSA, he studied for the CPA and passed the test. But deciding that he didn't want to be an accountant, he studies for the judicial exam and passes. After graduating from the Judicial Research and Training Institute at the age of 30, he tries to land an easy position as a DA but ends up in the "Organized Crime and Violent Crime Analysis Team." However, he isn't that disappointed. The fact that they appointed a rookie D.A. like him to be in charge must mean that the team will last only about three months as so many other special task forces have before, or it must be a publicity stunt, or a ploy to get more budget. So it's the perfect place for someone like him who doesn't have any sense of justice or the drive to catch criminals. He just hopes to kill time and become a lawyer when the time is right. He wishes he won't get tangled up in a difficult situation.

Jae-yoon believes that:
"Protector of the people? Just do your job. That will make everyone happy."
"A husband who talks too much about his family often turns out to be a wife-beater and a leader who talks too much about team-work often turns out to be a bad leader."
"Try not to want anything too much, whether it's love or work. Your happiness ends the moment you start to desire."
"It's better to give up as soon as you can."
"Women are like bad habits. Keep them around all the time but always think about quitting."
"Being a pioneer is great. But I don't have to be that person."

Kim Jung-min as Kim Yong-doo
Kim Yong-doo is a 40-year-old ex-cop who currently runs a bar. He was demoted after a serial murder case that took the life of Soo-kyung's boyfriend Han Sang-min 14 years ago. He tried to forget about the incident by being a traffic police officer but that didn't work and he opened a bar after retiring. His old colleagues and cops are his regulars. He feels guilty about Han's death and he's compassionate towards Soo-kyung who took refuge in her work after losing her loved one. Somewhere along the line, that compassion turned to love. He hopes that Soo-kyung will leave the past behind and move on but she seems to have a problem opening herself up and she still has the tendency to link any homicide case to that old case.

He may have quit the force, but the reason he is lingering around by opening a bar near the agency and asks around for any information whenever there's a murder case and collects any related information, is because he still can't let go of it either.

When Jae-yoon comes into Soo-kyung's life, he doesn't know whether to be happy or sad.

He's a good bar owner who treats even the rudest customer well and is Soo-kyung's best friend who has stayed by her side for 15 years. Both of them go on dates and hook each other up with people they know, but still joke around, saying, "Is it considered cheating if I marry someone else?" "I think so."

Yoon Ji-min as Jung In-hee
Jung In-hee is a doctor at the National Institute of Scientific Investigation, specializing in hypnosis. She's also a criminal analyst at the Seoul Metropolitan Police Agency's VICAT (Violent Crime Analysis Team). She analyzes crime and refreshes the suspect's or the victim's memory with hypnosis. She also uses a lie detector when a case is assigned to VICAT.

She has known Jae-yoon since childhood, as their families were close. He is her confidant as well as her crush.

Supporting characters

Son Hyun-joo as Superintendent Jo Gyu-won 
Ma Dong-seok as Detective Nam Seong-shik
Jung Eun-woo as Detective Kim Il-joo
Kim Jung-tae as Detective Shim Jong-geum
Choi Il-hwa as Detective Jang Yong-hwa
Lee Young-ha as D.A. Jung Taek-won, In-hee's father
Jung Sun-woo as Yeo Soon-kyung
Seo Hyun-jin as Jang Hee-jin, Detective Jang's daughter
Song Kwi-hyun as Chief of Police
Jo Kyung-hwan as Police Commissioner
Yoon Seo-hyun as Jung Man-soo
Ji Sang-ryul as Kang Yong-pil
Jeon Young-bin as Kim Jung-bin
Son Il-kwon as Shin Chang-soo
Um Hyo-sup as Shin Il-young
Oh Yeon-seo as Son Seong-ok
Yoon Joo-hee as nurse
Joo Min-ha
Na Kyung-mi
Son Young-soon
Choi In-sook
Han Young-kwang
Lee Hae-in
Jung Jin-gak
Jung Kyung-ho as Lee Hae-kang (guest appearance, ep 4)
Jung Ho-bin (guest appearance)
Kim Bu-seon (guest appearance)
Jung Doo-hong (cameo appearance)
 Jo Jae-yoon

References

International broadcast
 It aired in Vietnam on HTV3 beginning July 3, 2010.

External links
H.I.T official MBC website 
H.I.T at MBC Global Media

MBC TV television dramas
2007 South Korean television series debuts
2007 South Korean television series endings
Korean-language television shows
South Korean crime television series
Television shows written by Kim Young-hyun
Television series by Kim Jong-hak Production